San Miguelito is a Panama Metro station. It is an interchange station on Line 1 and Line 2. It was one of the first 11 stations when the metro began operations on 6 April 2014. It is the third of six elevated stations when travelling towards the terminus of San Isidro.

The station is located in San Miguelito District. As of 2015, it was the fourth most used station on the network at peak times, carrying 13% of the network's passengers. 

In October 2016 construction of the station's line 2 platforms began. The Line 2 station was opened on 26 April 2019 as the western terminus of the initial section of Line 2 between San Miguelito and Nuevo Tocumen.

References

Panama Metro stations
2014 establishments in Panama
Railway stations opened in 2014
San Miguelito District